Martin High School is located in the South east corner of Martin, Michigan. The school system has been around for over 75 years. The schools mascot is the Clipper ship, so teams are called the Martin Clippers. Football, Baseball, Basketball and Track are some of the sports played at this school. From time to time other sports have been encouraged. At one time they had a golf team.

The school serves a small farming community. Average enrollment is about 600, which includes K-12th grades. Average graduation class size is about 50 students, but can vary, depending on enrollment.

References

External links
 Martin Clippers historical football scores

Schools in Allegan County, Michigan
Educational institutions in the United States with year of establishment missing
Public high schools in Michigan
Public middle schools in Michigan